The 18th Cruiser Division may refer to:

18th Cruiser Division/Cruiser Division 18 of the Imperial Japanese Navy
Cruiser Division 18 of the United States Navy